Medardo Galli (6 April 1907 – 18 October 1985) was an Italian rower. He competed at the 1928 Summer Olympics in Amsterdam with the men's eight where they were eliminated in the quarter-final.

References

External links
 

1907 births
1985 deaths
Italian male rowers
Olympic rowers of Italy
Rowers at the 1928 Summer Olympics
Sportspeople from Piacenza
European Rowing Championships medalists